The Church of Jerusalem can refer to any of these sees or dioceses:

Greek Orthodox Church of Jerusalem (1st century AD–present)
Armenian Patriarchate of Jerusalem (638–present), the see of Oriental Orthodox Churches in Jerusalem
Latin Patriarchate of Jerusalem (1099–1291 and 1847–present), the Latin Rite Roman Catholic archdiocese in Jerusalem
Anglican Diocese of Jerusalem (1841–present), the diocese of the Anglican Church in Jerusalem,; see Anglican Bishop in Jerusalem
Melkite Greek Catholic Church (1724-present), whose bishops carry the title of Patriarch of Antioch and All the East, of Alexandria and Jerusalem of the Melkite Greek Catholic Church

See also
Jerusalem church (disambiguation)
Jerusalem in Christianity
Church of the Holy Sepulchre
Early centers of Christianity#Jerusalem

Church of Jerusalem
Jerusalem
Apostolic sees